Dirigent may refer to:
 Conducting
 Dirigent protein, a class of proteins which dictate the stereochemistry of a compound synthesized by other enzymes